Akkamma Stalinum Patrose Gandhiyum was a 2015 Indian comedy TV series which aired from
5 January 2015 and 3 July 2015 for 129 Episodes, Asianet channel. Veena Nair and Shaju played the title characters. The series was telecasted from Monday to Thursdays. The show ended in 6 months and was replaced by the horror series "7 rathrikal". This is rebroadcast in Asianet Plus.

Plot
The story revolves around the journey of a married couple Akkamma Stalin and Pathros Gandhi who differ on their Political views: Akkamma is a communist, Patros is a congressman. The story highlights different types of political parody happening in Kerala and the view of the characters on it.

Cast
 Veena Nair as Akkamma Stalin
 Kalabhavan Shaju as Pathrose Gandhi
 Aadil Mohammed as Nehru Lenin
 Vijayakumari as Mariyamma
 Azeez as Appukuttan (Akkama's Political Man)
Geetha Salam as OudhaKutty
Solomon (not found)

Awards
Won-Asianet Television Award 2015
Best Comedy Serial

References 

Malayalam-language television shows
2015 Indian television series debuts
2015 Indian television series endings
Indian television soap operas
Asianet (TV channel) original programming